The 1969–70 Indiana Hoosiers men's basketball team represented Indiana University. Their head coach was Jerry Oliver, who was acting as head coach while the previous head coach, Lou Watson, was taking a year-long leave of absence to recover from surgery. The team played its home games in New Fieldhouse in Bloomington, Indiana, and was a member of the Big Ten Conference.

The Hoosiers finished the regular season with an overall record of 7–17 and a conference record of 3–11, finishing 10th in the Big Ten Conference. Indiana was not invited to play in any postseason tournament.

Roster

Schedule/Results

|-
!colspan=8| Regular Season
|-

References

Indiana Hoosiers
Indiana Hoosiers men's basketball seasons
Indiana Hoosiers
Indiana Hoosiers